Campina do Simão is a municipality in the state of Paraná in the Southern Region of Brazil. The municipality was first settled at the beginning on the 20th century, and is named for its first resident, José Simão, also known as Jeca Simão. Campina do Simão was originally part of the municipality of Guarapuava; it became a separate district of Guarapuava in 1964, and an independent municipality on January 1, 1997.

See also
List of municipalities in Paraná

References

Municipalities in Paraná